is a horizontal-scrolling shooter video game developed and published by Granzella. Part of Irem's long-running R-Type series, it is a sequel to R-Type Final released in 2004, and the first R-Type game in over a decade, after the release of R-Type Tactics II: Operation Bitter Chocolate in 2009. The game was released for the Microsoft Windows, Nintendo Switch, PlayStation 4, Xbox One, and Xbox Series X/S on April 29, 2021.

The western versions of the game are published by NIS America, and were released on April 30, 2021. R-Type Final 2 is the first game in the series to be released outside of Japan since R-Type Dimensions in 2009.

Development
On April 1, 2019, Granzella released a teaser trailer for R-Type Final 2. Later that day, the company confirmed via Twitter that the game was not an April Fools joke and was actively in development. A crowdfunding campaign was announced to be taking place in May, with an additional campaign also taking place in October the same year. The developers has announced there will be rewards to give to those who contributed, they will receive different sets of gifts depends on the differ tiers funding they made in the project, these sets includes the Physical copy of the game, digital copy of the game, original soundtrack CD, hardcover art book, tee shirt, as well as the contributor's name to be featuring in the endgame credit. There are also 4 brand new player-ships for the title. The game is developed using Epic Games' Unreal Engine 4.

R-Type Final 2 is being produced by Goro Matsuo and designed by Kazuma Kujo. Kujo previously worked on R-Type Delta, R-Type Tactics and R-Type Final, as well as other titles like several games in the Disaster Report series. The game was released on April 29, 2021 in Japan, and on April 30, 2021 worldwide.

Upgrade to R-Type Final 3
On June 18, 2021, Granzella Inc. confirmed the roadmap of updates with the free upgrade for R-Type Final 3.

Reception

The PlayStation 4 version of R-Type Final 2 sold 8,693 physical copies within its first week on sale in Japan, and was the twelfth best-selling retail game of the week in the country.
The Xbox Series X/S version of R-Type Final 2 received generally positive reviews, according to review aggregator website Metacritic. The PlayStation 4 and Switch versions of R-Type Final 2 received mixed or average reviews.

Notes

References

External links
 

2021 video games
Crowdfunded video games
Horizontally scrolling shooters
Irem games
PlayStation 4 games
PlayStation Network games
Nintendo Switch games
Xbox One games
Xbox Series X and Series S games
Windows games
R-Type
Science fiction video games
Side-scrolling video games
Single-player video games
Video games developed in Japan
Video game sequels
Granzella games